The Rochester Knighthawks (also known as the K-Hawks) are a professional box lacrosse team in the North Division of the National Lacrosse League. They play in Rochester, New York at the Blue Cross Arena at the War Memorial.

The Knighthawks are owned by Pegula Sports and Entertainment who purchased the intellectual property of the team from former owner Curt Styres who moved the previous version of the team to Halifax, Nova Scotia as the Halifax Thunderbirds at the end of the 2018–2019 season. As an expansion team they are not a continuation of the previous Knighthawks. All records and championships followed the original franchise to Halifax.

History 
The original Knighthawks played in Rochester from 1995 until 2019. They began as members of the Major Indoor Lacrosse League from 1995 to 1997 then became members of the NLL beginning with the league's inaugural 1998 season.

The Knighthawks reached the playoffs in each of their first 13 seasons, from 1995 to 2007. This is a league record going back to the league's original creation, the Eagle Pro Box Lacrosse League.  The previous record was 11 straight years, held by the Philadelphia Wings. They were also the first NLL team to win three consecutive championships (2012–14).

On September 13, 2018, owner Curt Styres announced that he would be accepting a new team in Halifax, Nova Scotia and would be relocating the Knighthawks' to the city for the winter 2019–2020 season. The Knighthawks intellectual property was sold to Terry and Kim Pegula (the latter of whom was raised in the Rochester suburbs) along with an expansion franchise to ensure Rochester's uninterrupted presence in the league. The original name was used, but the color scheme and logo changed. The team logo, colors, and other officials were announced on May 29, 2019 in an event at Blue Cross Arena. The new franchise does not count as a continuation of the previous franchise. All championships and records were transferred to Halifax.

On June 27, 2019, the Knighthawks named Mike Hasen, who had coached the original Knighthawks since 2011, as head coach, Dan Carey as General Manager, and Pat O'Toole as assistant coach.

Current roster

All-time record

Head coaching history

Draft history

NLL Entry Draft 
First Round Selections

 2019: Ryland Rees (2nd overall)
 2020: Ryan Smith (3rd overall)
 2022: Thomas McConvey (1st overall), Austin Hasen (18th overall)

References

External links
 Official Website

 
Knighthawks
Lacrosse clubs established in 2019
Lacrosse teams in New York (state)
National Lacrosse League teams
Pegula Sports and Entertainment
2019 establishments in New York (state)